The Telugu Filmfare Best Supporting Actress Award is given by the Filmfare magazine as part of its annual Filmfare Awards for Telugu films. The award was introduced and first given at the 50th Filmfare Awards South in 2002.

Superlatives

Sivagami Devi is the only character to win most Best Supporting Actress awards. Ramya Krishna won for portraying the character in both Baahubali: The Beginning and Baahubali: The Conclusion, respectively in 2015 and in 2017.

Winners

Nominations
 2020–2021: Tabu – Ala Vaikunthapurramuloo
Madonna Sebastian – Shyam Singha Roy
Priyanka Jawalkar – Gamanam
Ramya Krishna – Republic
Saranya Pradeep – Jaanu
Vijayashanti – Sarileru Neekevvaru
2018: Anasuya Bharadwaj as Rangamma Attha – Rangasthalam
 Asha Sarath as Vaishnavi Natarajan – Bhaagamathie
 Malavika Nair as Sisira Bharadwaj – Taxiwaala
 Mehreen Pirzada as Lavanya – Kavacham
 Praveena Parachuri  as Saleema – C/o Kancharapalem
 Samantha Akkineni as Madhuravani – Mahanati
2017: Ramya Krishna as Shivagami Matha – Baahubali 2: The Conclusion
Bhumika Chawla as RTO Jyothi – Middle Class Abbayi
 Catherine Tresa as Devika Rani – Nene Raju Nene Mantri
 Jayasudha as Janakamma – Sathamanam Bhavati
 Saranya Pradeep as Renuka – Fidaa
2016: Nandita Swetha – Ekkadiki Pothavu Chinnavada
Anasuya as ACP Jaya – Kshanam
 Anupama Parameswaran as Nagavalli – A Aa
 Priyamani as Susheela – Mana Oori Ramayanam
 Ramya Krishna  as Satyabhama – Soggade Chinni Nayana
2015: Ramya Krishna as Queen Shivagami – Baahubali: The Beginning 
Kriti Kharbanda as Kavya – Bruce Lee – The Fighter
Pavitra Lokesh as Parvathi – Malli Malli Idi Rani Roju
Revathi as Lakshmi Murali – Loafer
Sukrithi as Bhavana – Kerintha
2014: Lakshmi Manchu as Lisa Smith – Chandamama Kathalu
Jayasudha as Lakshmi – Rowdy
Karthika Nair as Maha Lakshmi/Lucky – Brother of Bommali
Nadhiya as IG Geetha – Drushyam
Shriya Saran Dr. Anjali and Rama lakshmi – Manam
2013: Lakshmi Manchu as Chitra – Gundello Godari
Anjali as Sita – Seethamma Vakitlo Sirimalle Chettu
Nadhiya as Sunanda – Attarintiki Daredi
Pranitha Subhash as Pramila – Attarintiki Daredi
Punarnavi Bhupalam  as Sunitha – Uyyala Jampala
2012: Amala – Life Is Beautiful
Chinmayi Ghatrazu – Lovely
Kovai Sarala – Sudigadu
Saloni Aswani – Bodyguard
2011: Baby Annie – Rajanna
Aksha Pardasany – Kandireega
Lakshmi Manchu – Anaganaga O Dheerudu
Poonam Kaur – Gaganam
Taapsee Pannu – Mr. Perfect
2010: Abhinaya – Shambo Shiva Shambo
Ramya Krishna – Ranga The Donga
Roja – Golimaar
Saranya Ponvannan – Puli
Suhasini Maniratnam – Leader
2009: Ramya Krishna – Konchem Ishtam Konchem Kashtam
Kalpika Ganesh – Prayanam
Lakshmi – Eenadu
Manorama – Arundhati
Namitha – Billa
2008: Jayasudha – Kotha Bangaru Lokam
Meera Jasmine – Gorintaku
Parvati Melton – Jalsa
Poonam Kaur – Souryam
Tabu – Pandurangadu
2007: Sonia Deepti – Happy Days
Gayatri Rao – Happy Days
Kalyani – Lakshyam
Mamta Mohandas – Yamadonga
Sindhu Menon – Chandamama 
2006: Sandhya – Annavaram
Charmy Kaur – Rakhi
Jayasudha – Bommarillu
Jayasudha – Style
2005: Neha Oberoi – Balu ABCDEFG
Anushka Shetty – Super
Bhanupriya – Chhatrapati
Sangeetha – Sankranti
Veda Sastry – Nuvvostanante Nenoddantana
2004: Keerthi Reddy – Arjun
Aamani – Aa Naluguru
Charmy Kaur – Mass
Satya Krishnan – Anand
2003: Jayasudha – Amma Nanna O Tamila Ammayi
Kalyani – Vasantam
Sindhu Tolani – Aithe
Talluri Rameshwari – Nijam
2002: Sangeetha – Khadgam
Anshu – Manmadhudu
Bhanupriya – Lahiri Lahiri Lahirilo
Gracy Singh – Santosham

See also 
 Filmfare Awards (Telugu)
 Telugu cinema

Notes

References

Supporting actress